Homes England is the non-departmental public body that funds new affordable housing in England. It was founded on 1 January 2018 to replace the Homes and Communities Agency (HCA).
HCA in turn was established by the Housing and Regeneration Act 2008 as one of the successor bodies to the Housing Corporation, and became operational on 1 December 2008.

History
On 17 January 2007, Ruth Kelly announced proposals to bring together the investment functions of the Housing Corporation, English Partnerships and parts of the Department for Communities and Local Government to form a new unified housing and regeneration agency. It would also incorporate the functions of the Academy for Sustainable Communities and the government's advisory team for large applications.

In the following months, Martin Cave, Director of the Centre for Management under Regulation at University of Warwick, led the most comprehensive review of English housing regulation for 30 years. Reporting in June, the Cave Review recommended that a new regulator be set up, separating the regulation and investment responsibilities of the Housing Corporation.

On 15 October 2007, Yvette Cooper announced that the Government accepted the recommendation of the Cave Review to transfer the Corporation's regulatory powers to an independent body, subsequently named as the Tenant Services Authority (TSA). The new investment body was initially announced as "Communities England", and later renamed as the Homes and Communities Agency.

The Chief Executive for the body was announced as Bob Kerslake in December 2007. Kerslake had led the regeneration of Sheffield as chief executive of the City Council since 1997.

On 17 October 2008 the Housing Minister Iain Wright announced the Board members of the HCA including Robert Napier (chair), Kate Barker, Candy Atherton, and Shaukat Moledina (previously Vice-Chair of the Housing Corporation).

Kerslake was appointed as a Permanent Secretary at the agency's parent Department for Communities and Local Government in September 2010. The HCA announced that it would appoint an interim Chief Executive from existing staff.

Housing minister Grant Shapps announced early on that the TSA would be abolished as part of the cull of quangos by the coalition government after the 2010 general election. In June 2010, he said that the HCA would be retained but become "smaller, more strategic - with the HCA's functions being delivered under local leadership."

In September 2010, the HCA was also included on a list of organisations being considered for closure. However, Shapps announced in October that the TSA would be merged into the HCA. In November, he confirmed that the HCA would be retained, but reformed to cut running costs.

New initiatives
The HCA's Kickstart programme provided grants to developers in order to rescue stalled projects during the recession, helping to maintain employment and output of new homes. One of the most groundbreaking Kickstart projects was a £45.6 million investment in Berkeley Homes to provide 555 new homes for rent on the open market, located in London, the south east and south west. 
However, after a campaign for disclosure by Building Design magazine, the agency revealed that many Kickstart projects failed to meet CABE's standards of good design.

Sale of ransom strips 
The pilot sale of micro plots was compared to driveway ransoms when Homes England wrote to householders in Birmingham warning that Homes England owned microplots between the household and the public road.  Homes England said it had written to 90 householders however a freedom of information request found over 500 micro plots for sale in the Redditch and Bromsgrove boroughs.  Homes England said that if householders did not purchase microplots they could be sold to third parties.  A third party sale was expected by homeowners to result in the micro plot being used as a ransom strip.

Social Housing Regulator
The Homes and Communities Agency acted as the government's Social Housing Regulator. It provided regular reports on each registered social housing agency in England. In March 2014, it made its first ruling that a housing association had breached its "serious detriment" threshold for harm to consumers for its home repairs against Circle 33, due to "chronic and long standing difficulties in the delivery of the repairs service".

In Scotland this function is performed by the Scottish Housing Regulator. In Wales, the function is carried out by the Welsh government.

References

External links
 

Housing in England
Public housing in England
Non-departmental public bodies of the United Kingdom government
Department for Levelling Up, Housing and Communities
Interested parties in planning in England
Governance of England
2008 establishments in England
Regulators of England
Government agencies established in 2008
Housing organisations based in London